Mandana of Media (Old Iranian: Mandanā) was a shahbanu of Media and, later, the queen consort of Cambyses I of Anshan and mother of Cyrus the Great, ruler of Persia's Achaemenid Empire.

Etymology
The name Mandane is a Latinized form derived from the Greek Μανδάνη, Mandánē, itself from the Old Iranian name *Mandanā- which means delighting and cheerful.

Mandana in Herodotus' histories

According to Herodotus, Mandane was the daughter of Astyages, King of Media.

Shortly after her birth, Herodotus reports that Astyages had a strange dream where his daughter urinated so much that Asia would flood. He consulted the magians who interpreted the dream as a warning that Mandane's son would overthrow his rule. To forestall that outcome, Astyages betrothed Mandane to the vassal prince, Cambyses I of Anshan, “a man of good family and quiet habits”, whom Astyages considered no threat to the Median throne. Astyages had a second dream when Mandane became pregnant where a vine grew from her womb and overtook the world. Terrified, he sent his most loyal court retainer, Harpagus, to kill the child. However, Harpagus loathed to spill royal blood and hid the child, Cyrus II, with a shepherd named Mitradates. Years later, Cyrus would defy his grandfather Astyages, leading to war between them; a war that Cyrus would have lost, but for Harpagus' defection at the battle of Pasargadae, leading to the overthrow of Astyages, as the dream had forecast.

Mandane in Xenophon's Cyropedia
Xenophon also gives reference to Mandane in his Cyropaedia (The Education of Cyrus). In this story, Mandane and her son travel to Astyages' court, when Cyrus is in his early teens. Cyrus charms his grandfather, who includes the boy in royal hunts, while Mandane returns to her husband in Anshan. It is when Cyrus concocts a story that his father, Cambyses I, is ill and returns to visit him that Astyages comes after him and the battle is joined.

Death
There are references to Mandana's death as 559 BC; however, as this year is considered the date of her husband's death (Cambyses I), it is unknown if that is the actual date of her death or when she changed status from queen consort to queen mother.

Sources

Persian queens consort
Median people
6th-century BC women
Queens of the Achaemenid Empire
580s BC births
Year of death unknown
6th-century BC Iranian people
Ancient Persian women
Ancient princesses
Cyrus the Great
Median dynasty